Diving was a sport at the 2011 Summer Universiade from August 16 to August 22 at the Shenzhen Swimming and Diving Gym in Shenzhen, China. Men's and women's 1 and 3 metre springboard, 10 metre platform, synchronized 3 and 10 metre platform, and team events will be held.

Medal summary

Medal table

Men's events

Women's events

References

2011 in diving
2011 Summer Universiade events
Diving at the Summer Universiade